Terje Vigen is a poem written by Henrik Ibsen, published in 1862. Much of the story and setting is from the area around the town of Grimstad in southern Norway where Ibsen lived for a few years in his youth. It describes the dramatic saga of Terje who, in 1809, tried to run the British blockade of Norway's southern coast in a small rowboat in a desperate attempt to smuggle food from Denmark back to his starving wife and daughter. He was captured and imprisoned on a British prison hulk and released in 1814 after the Napoleonic Wars were over, only to find that his family had died. He became a pilot, and years later rescued an English lord who turned out to be the commander of the ship that had captured him. The denouement, as in most Ibsen works, should be understood by reading the original (links provided below).

Inspiration
In Grimstad Ibsen was inspired by the stories of the Norse maritime pilots. He became a close friend to one of the oldest and most experienced pilots, who had lived a remarkable life and had exciting stories to tell the young writer. His name was Svend Hanssen Haaø, from the island of Haaø (in modern Norwegian Håøya). The story of his life is often thought to be an important source for Ibsen when he wrote his famous poem Terje Vigen. See article "Who was Terje Vigen?"

Svend Hanssen Haaø's life contains many of the essential elements of the story of Terje Vigen. Haaø made several trips by rowboat to Denmark through the British blockade, in the years 1807-14, to smuggle food back to his family and friends in Grimstad. The British captured him as many as four times, and some of his crew were put to prison in England as in the poem. It is well documented that Henrik Ibsen and Svend Hanssen Haaø became close friends. They made a lot of visits to each other, both at Svend’s house at the Haaø Island, and in Ibsen’s department at Grimstad Pharmacy.

Henrik Ibsen never revealed if he had a model when he wrote the story of Terje Vigen. However, the most important specialists on Henrik Ibsen’s life in Grimstad, were convinced that Ibsen’s friendship with Svend and Svend’s remarkable life as a pilot at the coast was the most important inspiration for Ibsen.

Ibsen painted Svend sitting at Haaø Island. The painting is called The Pilot from  Haaø Island. This painting is placed in Ibsen's house in Grimstad, and is owned by Grimstad Museum.

Reception
In his biography of Ibsen, Edmund Gosse indicates: 
"He was perhaps momentarily saved by the publication of Terje Vigen, which enjoyed a solid popularity. This is the principal and, indeed, almost the only instance in Ibsen's works of what the Northern critics call "epic," but what we less ambitiously know as the tale in verse. Terje Vigen will never be translated successfully into English, for it is written, with brilliant lightness and skill, in an adaptation of the Norwegian ballad-measure which it is impossible to reproduce with felicity in our language."

"Among Ibsen's writings Terje Vigen is unique as a piece of pure sentimentality carried right through without one divagation into irony or pungency. It is the story of a much-injured and revengeful Norse pilot, who, having the chance to drown his old enemies, Milord and Milady, saves them at the mute appeal of their blue-eyed English baby. Terje Vigen is a masterpiece of what we may define as the "dash-away-a-manly- tear" class of narrative. It is extremely well written and picturesque, but the wonder is that, of all people in the world, Ibsen should have written it."

The poem and the character of Terje Vigen has become a core icon of Norwegian coastal culture and a sense of a national identity. Every year the poem is read at festivals and included in dance and music performances. Best known are the wood boat festival at Risør and the Ibsen festival in Grimstad. Norwegian Broadcasting Corporation, NRK, broadcasts on the radio a reading of Terje Vigen on New Year's Eve at midnight.

Notable adaptations
In 1917, Victor Sjöström directed an eponymous Swedish film based on the poem, retitled A Man There Was in English-speaking territories. A German remake of 1933, Das Meer ruft aka The Lake Calls, starred Heinrich George and was set on a fictional Baltic island under Russian occupation during the First World War.

The Norwegian composer Guttorm Guttormsen wrote his Terje Vigen for bass soloist and orchestra in 1977. In 1994/5, Jon Mostad wrote music for Terje Vigen for recitation, choir (SSA) and symphonic wind band.

Film maker Torstein Blixfjord directed a major multimedia adaptation in Yokohama, Japan in November 2006. The production involved a film projected across five cinema screens set up on Shinko Pier, which was accompanied by dancers. The film featured the poem narrated by Masato Ibu. The project formed the basis of Blixfjord's 2008/9 project Id - Identity of the Soul, which also featured contributions from the great Palestinian poet Mahmoud Darwish.

Also in 2006, composer and producer Kjell-Ole Haune developed Terje Vigen into a multimedia musical. This production went on tour in Norway and USA in 2006 and 2007 and was staged in London's West End in 2008.

References

External links

 Provides a Norwegian version of Ibsen's poem Terje Vigen
 Provides an English translation of Terje Vigen
 Link to the article: Who was Terje Vigen?
  Link to a Norwegian version of Terje Vigen in Rock, Beat & Blues
''Terje Vigen by Henrik Ibsen. KOH Ltd, London 2006 
 A video from Torstein Blixfjord's multimedia production
 Website for filmmaker Torstein Blixfjord

Works by Henrik Ibsen
Norwegian poems
1862 poems
Epic poems
Fictional Norwegian people